The Intel Extreme Masters Season XIII – World Championship or IEM Katowice 2019 was the world championship for the thirteenth season of the Intel Extreme Masters. It was held at the Spodek in Katowice, Silesian Voivodeship, Poland from February 13–March 3, 2019. The event featured tournaments for Counter-Strike: Global Offensive, Dota 2, StarCraft II, and Fortnite: Battle Royale. In addition, the Counter-Strike tournament was the game's fourteenth Major Championship.

Counter-Strike: Global Offensive

Valve awarded ESL a Counter-Strike: Global Offensive Major Championship for the first time in nearly two and a half years. This tournament featured twenty-four teams from around the world, fourteen of which were directly invited from their top fourteen placements from the last Major and another ten teams qualifying from their respective regional qualifiers.

Major Playoffs

Intel Challenge
This tournament also featured the Intel Challenge Katowice 2019, an eight team tournament consisted of female teams.

Group stage

Group A

Group B

Intel Challenge playoffs

Dota 2
Dota 2's tournament was called ESL One Katowice 2019 rather than IEM Katowice 2019 as ESL deemed it to be part of its Dota ESL One series.

Teams

Direct Invitees

  Alliance
  Chaos Esports Club
  Fnatic
  Forward Gaming
  Ninjas in Pyjamas
  OG
  Team Aster
  Team Secret

Qualifiers

  compLexity Gaming (North America)
  For The Dream (China)
  Gambit Esports (Europe)
  Mineski (Southeast Asia)

Group stage

Group A

Group B

Playoffs

Upper bracket

Lower bracket

Top 3

StarCraft II

Participants

Group stage

Playoffs

Fortnite: Battle Royale

Duos

 hrs - Chap
 7ssk7 - Jamside
 Bizzle - Dmo
 Boyerxd - Crippa
 Domentos - Fwexy
 Hoopek - Sk1x
 Issa - Kamo
 Kinstaar - Hunter
 Magin - Juganza
 Mirwana - Inclyde
 Mitr0 - Khuna
 Motor - ErycTriceps
 Nate Hill - FunkBomb
 RazZzero0o - x8
 Saf - Zayt
 Sak0ner - Skram
 Skite - Vato
 Taiovsky - Nero
 Teeqzy - Mushway
 Tfue - Cloak
 TheVic - Blaxou
 Vivid - Poach
 ZexRow - Vinny1x

References

2019 first-person shooter tournaments
Counter-Strike competitions
Intel Extreme Masters